The Ballad Style of Stan Kenton is an album by bandleader and pianist Stan Kenton featuring performances recorded in 1958 and released on the Capitol label.

Reception

The Allmusic review by Scott Yanow noted "The Ballad Style of Stan Kenton is an unusual set, for other than some muted trumpet, Kenton's melodic piano is the only soloist. The 13 ballads (a dozen standards and a band original) are given restrained treatments which hint at the band's power without overtly expressing it, and the music is both romantic and danceable. An underrated set".

Track listing
 "Then I'll Be Tired of You" (Arthur Schwartz, Yip Harburg) - 3:06
 "More Than You Know" (Vincent Youmans, Edward Eliscu, Billy Rose) - 3:21
 "When Stars Looked Down" (Dale Barnhart) - 3:42
 "The End of a Love Affair" (Edward Redding) - 2:51
 "A Sunday Kind of Love" (Barbara Belle, Anita Leonard, Louis Prima, Stan Rhodes) - 3:33
 "Moon Song" (Arthur Johnston, Sam Coslow) - 3:11
 "Early Autumn" (Ralph Burns, Woody Herman, Johnny Mercer) - 3:33
 "How Am I to Know?" (Jack King, Dorothy Parker) - 3:27
 "The Things We Did Last Summer" (Jule Styne, Sammy Cahn) - 3:18
 "We'll Be Together Again" (Carl T. Fischer, Frankie Laine) - 3:09
 "How Deep Is the Ocean?" (Irving Berlin) - 3:12
 "The Night We Called It a Day" (Matt Dennis, Tom Adair) - 2:41
 "Ill Wind" (Harold Arlen, Ted Koehler) - 2:51 Bonus track on CD reissue
Recorded at Capitol Studios in Hollywood, CA on May 19, 1958 (tracks 2, 7 & 12), June 6, 1958 (tracks 1, 4, 6, 8, 10 & 11) and June 23, 1958 (tracks 3, 5, 9 & 13).

Personnel
Stan Kenton - piano, conductor, arranger
Billy Catalano (tracks 1, 2, 7, 10 & 12), Jules Chaikin, Phil Gilbert, Don Fagerquist (tracks 1, 4, 6, 8, 10 & 11), Lee Katzman (tracks 2, 3, 5, 7, 9, 12 & 13), Ed Leddy (tracks 3-6, 8, 9, 11 & 13) - trumpet
Jim Amlotte, Bob Fitzpatrick (tracks 1, 3-6, 8-11 & 13), Kent Larsen, Archie Le Coque, Don Reed (tracks: 2, 7 & 12) - trombone
Ken Shroyer  - bass trombone  (tracks 1, 3, 5, 7, 9, 12 & 13)
Lennie Niehaus - alto saxophone  
Richie Kamuca, Bill Perkins - tenor saxophone  
Steve Perlow, Bill Robinson - baritone saxophone
Red Kelly - bass 
Jerry McKenzie (tracks 1, 3-6, 8-11 & 13), Mel Lewis (tracks 2, 7 & 12) - drums

References

 

Stan Kenton albums
1958 albums
Capitol Records albums
Albums conducted by Stan Kenton

Albums recorded at Capitol Studios
Albums produced by Lee Gillette